Pratima Mondal (née Naskar; born 	16 February 1966) is an Indian politician who has been a Member of Parliament for Jaynagar since 2014. She is belonging to the All India Trinamool Congress.

Personal life
Pratima Mondal was born on 16 February 1966, to a Bengali Hindu family in small beautiful village Gaur Daha in Jaynagar. She is daughter of the former Member of Parliament, Gobinda Chandra Naskar. Pratima Mondal is a postgraduate of the University of Calcutta. She was a WBCS officer before entering politics.

Political career
In the 2014 Lok Sabha election, the All India Trinamool Congress nominated Pratima Mondal from the Jaynagar Lok Sabha constituency. She was elected with 4,94,746 votes, which was 41.71% of the votes cast. She defeated her nearest rival Subhas Naskar of the Revolutionary Socialist Party by 1,08,384 votes.

References

Living people
1966 births
Lok Sabha members from West Bengal
People from Jaynagar Majilpur
University of Calcutta alumni
Women in West Bengal politics
21st-century Indian women politicians
21st-century Indian politicians
Anti-communism in India
Indian anti-communists
Bengali Hindus
Politicians from Kolkata
Trinamool Congress politicians from West Bengal
20th-century Indian women politicians
20th-century Indian politicians
Women members of the Lok Sabha
India MPs 2014–2019
India MPs 2019–present